Demon of Paradise is a 1987 horror film shot in the Philippines and directed by Cirio H. Santiago.

Plot

The film is set in Hawaii and features fire-twirling women who participate in rituals to appease the awakened monster. The hunters become the prey when illegal dynamite fishing prematurely ends the hibernation of a mythological beast known as Akua which lives in the lake. The owner of the local resort, whose patrons have become the prey of the monster, and a woman herpetologist join forces with the sheriff to save the tourists from succumbing to the fury of the beast.

Cast
 Kathryn Witt as Annie
 William Steis as Keefer
 Laura Banks as Cahill
 Frederick Bailey as Ike
 Leslie Scarborough as Gabby
 Henry Strzalkowski as Shelton
 Nick Nicholson as Langley
 Liza Baumann as Luisa
 David Light as Snake

Release

The film was released on VHS by Warner Home Video in the 1990s.
It was later released on DVD and Blu-ray by Shout! Factory in 2011 as a double feature alongside the similar Up From the Depths.

Reception

Paul Ryan from Digital Retribution, who had previously given the film's predecessor Up from the Depths a negative review, gave this film a more positive review stating, "Better made and directed than its predecessor, Demon of Paradise is, while entirely unmemorable, at least easier to sit through."

References

External links

 

1987 horror films
1987 films
American independent films
American monster movies
1980s monster movies
1980s English-language films
Films directed by Cirio H. Santiago
1980s American films